Everybody's a Fuckin Expert is the tenth studio album by Shit and Shine, released on 4 September 2015 by Editions Mego.

Track listing

Personnel
Adapted from the Everybody's a Fuckin Expert liner notes.
Shit and Shine
 Craig Clouse – vocals, instruments
Production and additional personnel
 Josey Clouse – cover art, photography
 Christoph Grote-Beverborg – mastering
 Stephen O'Malley – design

Release history

References

External links 
 
 Everybody's a Fuckin Expert at Bandcamp

2015 albums
Shit and Shine albums